This article displays the qualifying draw for the Women's singles at the 2008 Australian Open.

Seeds

Qualifiers

Qualifying draw

First qualifier

Second qualifier

Third qualifier

Fourth qualifier

Fifth qualifier

Sixth qualifier

Seventh qualifier

Eighth qualifier

Ninth qualifier

Tenth qualifier

Eleventh qualifier

Twelfth qualifier

References
Australian Open 2008 Women's Singles Championship
Australian Open 2008 - Qualifying Draw
 2008 Australian Open – Women's draws and results at the International Tennis Federation

Women's Singles Qualifying
Australian Open (tennis) by year – Qualifying